Heribert Offermanns (born October 24, 1937 in Merkstein near Aachen) is a German chemist and former member of the board of the Degussa AG.

Life and work

Offermanns studied chemistry at the Rheinisch-Westfälische Technische Hochschule Aachen (RWTH Aachen). He worked on his doctoral thesis as assistant to Friedrich Asinger on the border between organic and technical chemistry. After receiving his doctorate he worked afterwards on industrial chemistry and pharmaceutical research at the Degussa AG and at Degussa Antwerpen NV and Degussa Inc., New York. In 1976 Offermanns was appointed as member of the management board of Degussa AG with the responsibility for research and development.
Offermanns remained a member of the board until 2000. He managed the development and expansion of Degussa's research center in Hanau-Wolfgang.

Honours 
Heribert Offermanns was the president of the German Chemical Society and a member of the Senate of the German Research Foundation (DFG). He was also a member of the board of Johann Wolfgang Goethe-University in Frankfurt and the University of Regensburg. 
Offermanns was board member of the  Paul Ehrlich Foundation and chairman of the board of trustees of the Max-Planck-Institute for Solid State Research, Stuttgart. Since 1988 he was Honorary Professor at the Johann Wolfgang Goethe University in Frankfurt.
Heribert Offermanns has published numerous scientific papers on sulfur chemistry and on the production and use of hydrogen peroxide, he holds also several patents.

Awards 
 Heribert Offermanns received an honorary doctorate in engineering at the RWTH Aachen
 1997: Carl Duisberg Medal of the German Chemical Society
 2001: Karl Winnacker Prize of the University of Marburg
 2011: Officer's Cross of the Order of Merit of the Federal Republic of Germany

Publications 
 
 
 
 H. Offermanns: A plea for basic research - Utility is just a second-order moment, in: Chemie in unserer Zeit 2002, 36, 306–309.
 H. Offermanns: Wasserstoffperoxid - Verwendung in Umweltschutz und Synthese, in: Chemie in unserer Zeit 2000, 34, 150–159.
 
 
 H. Offermanns, F. Asinger: Synthesen mit Ketonen, Schwefel und Ammoniak bzw. Aminen und chemisches Verhalten der Reaktionsprodukte, Westdeutscher Verlag, Köln und Opladen, 1966.

References

20th-century German chemists
Recipients of the Cross of the Order of Merit of the Federal Republic of Germany
1937 births
Living people
21st-century German chemists
Scientists from North Rhine-Westphalia
RWTH Aachen University alumni